Alathiyur Hanuman Temple is a famous Hindu temple located at Alathiyur near Tirur, Malappuram district, Kerala state, India. Over the years the "custodians" of the temple were Alathiyur Grama Namboodiri, the Raja of the Kingdom of Tanur (Vettathunad), and Samoothiri of Kozhikode. According to local myths, the "Purumthrikkovil idol" of the deity Hanuman was consecrated 3000 years ago by Vasistha, one of the Saptarishis. Even though the main deity of the temple is Hindu god Rama the temple is famous and known as a "Hanuman temple". The shrine of Hanuman is located to the south of Rama temple, and there are sub-shrines for Ganapathi, Ayyappan, Durga, Bhadrakali and Lakshamana in the temple.

Abode of Hanuman
 
The temple of Sri Hanuman is adjacent to the main Temple of Sree Rama. Sree Hanuman has his head tilted to left (to Rama's Adobe), to hear his master’s words. Sree Rama is confiding in Hanuman the cue-word ( Abhignana Vaakyam ) that would enable him to gain the confidence of Sita. Hanuman has a mace in his hand. The numerous Gods bestowed their enormous power on Sree Hanuman. He is all set to accomplish his mission, which is seeking the whereabouts of Sita. Here he is the personification of divine strength, confidence, concentration of purpose, Bhakti, and above all humility. He is the symbol of supreme self-sacrifice. He seems to be assuring Sree Rama: "Your wish is my command". Devotees of Hanuman throng to this temple to make their wishes and be heard by the mighty Hanuman.

As the situation in Ramayana, Lakshmana is away from Rama and Hanuman so that he can't be hearing the cue-word.

Location and transport
The nearest railway station is about 12 km away from Tirur. The nearest airport is at Kozhikode.

See also
 Religions of Kerala
 Temples of Kerala

References

External links

 Alathiyoor Hanuman kavu The official website of the Alathiyur Hanuman Temple

Hanuman temples
Hindu temples in Malappuram district